Arash Motor Company is a British supercar & hypercar manufacturer based in Newmarket, Suffolk. It was originally established by Arash Farboud as Farboud Limited in 1999, and changed name in 2006. The company has expanded to North-America with a manufacturing facility in Bolton, Ontario, Canada. 

The company has made four models to date: the AF-LM (a prototype Le Mans tribute car), the Farboud GTS (a super sports car), the AF-8 (their first supercar) and the AF-10 (a hypercar). 

Currently only the AF-8 & AF-10 are in production but a new car is due to be released in 2021.  

The company is an ultra-low volume manufacturer, producing less than 3 cars per year. Sales are equally low, having sold fewer than 80 cars since commencement.

History

The company began developing the Farboud GT in 1999 under the name Farboud Ltd. This was launched at The Autosport Show held at the Birmingham NEC in 2001. He went on to design the Farboud GTS which was officially launched at the British Motorshow in London in 2004. At that time Chris Marsh was working with Arash as a sales representative, who is the son of Jem Marsh who founded Marcos cars with Frank Costin (Marsh+Costin=Marcos). Marsh became enthusiastic about the Farboud GTS and Arash subsequently granted him a licence to use the shape of the car and assist with the development in exchange for shares in the new car company.
Marsh subsequently simplified the design by substituting the Audi RS4 based racing engine with a Ford V6. He also changed some cosmetic features including the doors, windows and interior parts. After a dispute in 2005, Marsh renamed the car "The Farbio". This was to announce the Farboud car link to "biofuel" and fitted more with the brand rework. He originally attempted to call the car "The Fangio", but there was push-back from the deceased Formula 1 driver's Argentine family regarding remuneration. 

Arash sold his shares of Farbio to Michael Simmonds. Arash continued as 100% shareholder of Farboud Ltd. This later became Arash Motor Co.
The design and concept was later sold to Laurence Tomlinson of Ginetta, who kept the design and renamed the car the Ginetta F400.

Models

Farboud GT
The Farboud GT was the company's first model, announced in 2002 at the Autosport International show in Birmingham. It featured a 2.8-litre V6 twin turbo engine producing 620 bhp.

Farboud GTS
The Farboud GTS was shown as a concept car at Autosport International in 2003. Three cars were built before the design was sold to Farbio Sports Cars and production started in 2007 with the car sold as the Farbio GTS. Following the merging of Farbio with Ginetta, the GTS was further developed as the Ginetta F400.

Arash AF10
In 2009, Arash displayed the AF10, featuring a Chevrolet Corvette-sourced 7.0-litre V8 engine producing at least 500 bhp. The car was not put into production but Arash later revealed a revised model in 2016 with a hybrid drivetrain and a horsepower claim of 2,080 hp.

It also features in the car racing game Asphalt 8: Airborne as one of the fastest cars in the game, placed up high in Class S with a rank of S1859.

Arash AF8
The AF8 was designed by Arash and revealed at the Geneva Motor Show 2016. It featured a carbon/steel tubed chassis and a mid-engined 7.0-litre V8 engine producing 505 bhp. It later went up the hill at the Goodwood Festival of Speed in 2015 and 2016.

See also
 Automotive industry in the United Kingdom
 List of car manufacturers of the United Kingdom
 List of automobiles manufactured in Ontario

References

External links

Vehicle manufacturing companies established in 1999
Car manufacturers of the United Kingdom
Companies based in Suffolk
Sports car manufacturers
1999 establishments in England